Social responsibility  is an ethical framework in which an individual is obligated to work and cooperate with other individuals and organizations for the benefit of the community that will inherit the world that individual leaves behind.

Social responsibility is a duty every individual has to maintain; a balance between the economy and the ecosystem one lives within. A trade-off might perhaps exist between economic development, in the material sense, and the welfare of the society and environment. Social responsibility pertains not only to business organizations but also to everyone whose actions impact the environment. It aims to ensure secure healthcare for people living in rural areas and eliminate barriers like distance, financial condition, etc. Another example is keeping the outdoors free of trash and litter by using the ethical framework combining the resources of land managers, municipalities, nonprofits, educational institutions, businesses, manufacturers, and individual volunteers, which will be required to solve the ocean microplastics crisis. One can be socially responsible passively, by avoiding engaging in socially harmful acts, or actively, by performing activities that advance social goals. Social responsibility must be intergenerational, since the actions of one generation have consequences on those following.

Corporate social responsibility

Ethical decision making by businesses can prevent costly intervention in those businesses by government agencies. For instance, if a company follows the United States Environmental Protection Agency (EPA) guidelines for emissions of dangerous pollutants and goes further involved the community and address concerns the public might have, they might be less likely to have the EPA investigate them for environmental concerns. "A significant element of current thinking about privacy, however, stresses 'self-regulation' rather than market or government mechanisms for protecting personal information." According to some experts, most rules and regulations are formed due to public outcry, which threatens profit maximization and therefore the well-being of shareholders; if there is no outcry, there often will be limited regulation.

Some critics argue that corporate social responsibility (CSR) distracts from the fundamental economic role of businesses; others argue that it is nothing more than superficial window-dressing, or "greenwashing"; others argue that it is an attempt to pre-empt the role of governments as a watchdog over powerful corporations, although there is no systematic evidence to support these criticisms. A significant number of studies have shown no negative influence on shareholder results from CSR but rather a slightly negative correlation with improved shareholder returns.

Corporate social responsibility or CSR has been defined by Lord Holme and Richard Watts in the World Business Council for Sustainable Development's publication "Making Good Business Sense" as "the continuing commitment by business to behave ethically and contribute to economic development while improving the quality of life of the workforce and their families as well as the local community and society at large." CSR is a strategy with which companies try to create a positive impact on society while doing business. Evidence suggests that CSR adopted voluntarily by companies is more effective than CSR mandated by governments. There is no clear-cut definition of what CSR comprises. Every company has different CSR objectives, though the main motive is the same, though these CSR often involves conflicts of interest that must be navigated. Companies try improve qualitatively (the management of people and processes) and quantitatively (the impact on society). Company stakeholders take an interest in "the outer circle"how the activities of the company are impacting the environment and society. 

While many corporations include social responsibility in their operations, those procuring the goods and services may independently ensure the products are socially sustainable. Verification tools are available from many entities internationally, for example the Underwriters Laboratories environmental standards, BioPreferred, and Green Seal. A reputation aligned with social responsibility is linked to higher profits, particularly when firms voluntarily report the positive and negative impacts of their social responsibility endeavors. 

Certification processes like these help corporations and their consumers identify potential risks associated with a product's lifecycle and enable end users to confirm the corporation's practices adhere to social responsibility ideals. A reputation for social responsibility leads to more positive responses toward a brand's products by inducing a reciprocal desire to help companies that have helped others, an effect that is more prominent among consumers who value helping others and is reduced if consumers doubt a firm's intentions.

Scientists and engineers

Are scientists and engineers morally responsible for the negative consequences that result from applications of their knowledge and inventions? If scientists and engineers take pride in the positive achievements of science and technology, shouldn't they also accept responsibility for the negative consequences related to the use or abuse of scientific knowledge and technological innovations? Scientists and engineers have a collective responsibility to examine the values embedded in the research problems they choose and the ethics of how they share their findings with the public.

Committees of scientists and engineers are often involved in planning governmental and corporate research programs, including those devoted to the development of military technologies and weaponry. Many professional societies and national organizations, such as the National Academy of Sciences and the National Academy of Engineering in the United States, have ethical guidelines (see Engineering ethics and Research ethics for the conduct of scientific research and engineering). Scientists and engineers, individually and collectively, have a special and greater responsibility than average citizens with respect to the generation and use of scientific knowledge.

Some argue that because of the complexity of social responsibility in research, scientists and engineers should not be blamed for all the evils created by new scientific knowledge and technological innovations. First, there is fragmentation and diffusion of responsibility: Because of the intellectual and physical division of labor, the resulting fragmentation of knowledge, the high degree of specialization, and the complex and hierarchical decision-making process within corporations and government research laboratories, it is exceedingly difficult for individual scientists and engineers to control the applications of their innovations. This fragmentation of work and decision-making results in fragmented moral accountability, often to the point where "everybody involved was responsible but none could be held responsible."

Another problem is ignorance. The scientists and engineers cannot predict how their newly generated knowledge and technological innovations may be abused or misused for destructive purposes. The excuse of ignorance is stronger for scientists involved in very basic and fundamental research where potential applications cannot be even envisioned, than for scientists and engineers involved in applied scientific research and technological innovation since in such work objectives are well known. For example, most corporations conduct research on specific products or services that promise to yield the greatest possible profit for share-holders. Similarly, most of the research funded by governments is mission-oriented, such as protecting the environment, developing new drugs, or designing more lethal weapons. In cases where the application of scientific knowledge and technological innovation is well known a priori, a scientist or engineer cannot escape responsibility for research and technological innovation that is morally dubious. As John Forge writes in Moral Responsibility and the Ignorant Scientist: "Ignorance is not an excuse precisely because scientists can be blamed for being ignorant."

Another point of view is that responsibility falls on those who provide the funding for the research and technological developments (in most cases corporations and government agencies). Because taxpayers provide the funds for government-sponsored research, they and the politicians that represent them should perhaps be held accountable for the uses and abuses of science. In times past scientists could often conduct research independently, but today's experimental research requires expensive laboratories and instrumentation, making scientists dependent on those who pay for their studies.

Quasi-legal instruments, or soft law principle has received some normative status in relation to private and public corporations in the United Nations Educational, Scientific and Cultural Organization (UNESCO) Universal Declaration on Bioethics and Human Rights developed by the UNESCO International Bioethics Committee particularly in relation to child and maternal welfare. The International Organization for Standardization will "encourage voluntary commitment to social responsibility and will lead to common guidance on concepts, definitions and methods of evaluation."

See also

 Accountability
 Corporate social responsibility
 Inclusive business
 SA8000
 Shareholder primacy
 Social enterprise
 Social entrepreneurship
 Socially responsible investing

Notes

References
 Haynes, T. (n.d.). Social Responsibility and Organizational Ethics. Retrieved May 8, 2010, from Answers.com: http://www.answers.com/topic/social-responsibility-and-organizational-ethics
 Kalinda, B. (Ed.). "Social Responsibility and Organizational Ethics." (2001). Encyclopedia of Business and Finance' (2nd ed., Vol. 1). New York: Macmillan Reference.
 Pride, William M., Hughes, Robert James, & Kickapoo, Jack R. (2008). Business (9th ed.) Boston, MA: Hough-ton McFarland Company. 

Further reading

 
 Huesemann, Michael H., and Joyce A. Huesemann (2011). Technofix: Why Technology Won't Save Us or the Environment, Chapter 14, "Critical Science and Social Responsibility", New Society Publishers, Gabriola Island, British Columbia, Canada, 464 pp.
 
 
 National Academy of Sciences, National Academy of Engineering, and Institute of Medicine, On Being a Scientist: Responsible Conduct in Research'', The National Academies Press, 1995, http://www.nap.edu
 
 
 
 

 
Concepts in ethics
Euthenics
Social ethics
Social movements
Sociological terminology